Dil Dhadakne Do is a 2015 Indian comedy-drama film directed by Zoya Akhtar. Produced by Ritesh Sidhwani and Farhan Akhtar, the film features an ensemble cast consisting of Anil Kapoor, Shefali Shah, Priyanka Chopra, Ranveer Singh, Anushka Sharma and Farhan Akhtar. The supporting cast also includes Rahul Bose, Zarina Wahab, Vikrant Massey, Ridhima Sud, Pawan Chopra, Parmeet Sethi, Dolly Mattdo and Manoj Pahwa. Akhtar co-wrote the screenplay with her friend and longtime collaborator Reema Kagti. The soundtrack was composed by the trio Shankar–Ehsaan–Loy while the cinematography was provided by Carlos Catalan. Anand Subaya and Manan Mehta edited the film.

The film tells the story of a dysfunctional Punjabi family (The Mehras) who invite their family and friends along on a cruise trip to celebrate the parents' 30th wedding anniversary. Dil Dhadakne Do was released worldwide on 5 June 2015 to positive reviews from critics. The film grossed 1.45 billion at global box office on a budget of 580 million. The film garnered awards and nominations in a variety of categories with particular praise for Akhtar's direction, the performances, the music and costume design.

Dil Dhadakne Do received five Filmfare nominations, winning Best Supporting Actor for Kapoor. It received nine nominations at the 2016 Screen Awards including Best Film, Best Director for Akhtar and Best Actress for Chopra. It went on to win two: Best Supporting Actor for Kapoor and the Best Ensemble Cast. At the 2015 Stardust Awards, the film received five nominations, including Actor of the Year – Female for Chopra and Actor of the Year – Male for Singh, winning three awards: Best Supporting Actor for Kapoor, Best Supporting Actress for Shah and Best Costume Design.

Accolades

Footnotes

References

External links 
 Accolades for Dil Dhadakne Do at the Internet Movie Database

Lists of accolades by Indian film